Pronouns are a class of words.

Pronoun may also refer to:
Pronoun (publishing platform), a New York-based company
Pronoun (musician), an American singer-songwriter
Pronoun game, an act of concealing sexual orientation
Pronoun dropping (pro-drop) language, a language in which pronoun classes are omitted
Preferred gender pronoun chosen by the individual

See also